Unnuakomys is an extinct metatherian mammal from the Maastrichtian age of the Late Cretaceous. It was discovered in the Prince Creek Formation of Alaska, and is the northernmost metatherian known.

Paleobiology 
Weighing less than an ounce, Unnuakomys was about the size of a mouse. It was likely an insectivore.

References 

Prehistoric metatherians
Fossil taxa described in 2019
Late Cretaceous mammals of North America
Prehistoric mammal genera
Maastrichtian genera